Neurosymploca kushaica is a species in the family Zygaenidae.
It is closely related to Neurosymploca dukeorum, but not conspecific.

Subspecies
There is one known subspecies:
Neurosymploca kushaica sani Axel Hofmann, 2017

Distribution
Neurosymploca kushaica can be found on the Cape Peninsula and the neighboring hillsides. The subspecies sani is located in Cedarberg, including the Pakhuis Pass.

Ecology

Caterpillars can mostly be found on Maytenus oleoides and rarely on Cassine schinoides.

Etymology
The species is named after the discoverer's son Kusha Charles in memory of their first field trip together.
The sani subspecies is named after the san people, of whom there are historical rock art paintings in its habitat.

References

Zygaenidae
Moths described in 2017